Heinrich Jacobi may refer to:
Friedrich Heinrich Jacobi (1743–1819), German philosopher
Heinrich Jacoby (1889–1964), German musician and educator, who was an important influence to body psychotherapy
Heinrich Jacobi (archaeologist) (1866–1946), German architect and archaeologist